Halstead railway station was located in Halstead, Essex. It closed in 1962.

References

External links
 Halstead station on navigable 1946 O. S. map
 

Disused railway stations in Essex
Former Colne Valley and Halstead Railway stations
Railway stations in Great Britain opened in 1860
Railway stations in Great Britain closed in 1962
Halstead